Piyabanna Ayeth (Fly Once More) is a 2022 Sri Lankan Sinhala romantic road film directed by Shirley Samarasinghe in his directorial debut and produced by Udara Palliyaguru for Guththila Films and D Cinema. The film stars Kalana Gunasekara and Chamatka Lakmini in lead roles, whereas Kalpa Munasinghe, Pokurumali Fernando, Marcus Fernando, and child actress Pahandi Nethara made supportive roles.

Plot

The film revolves around the tour of Sadisha and Nilantha and how Nilantha influence on Sadesha's life.

Cast
 Chamathka Lakmini as Sadisha 
 Kalana Gunasekara as Nilantha 
 Kalpa Munasinghe as Adisha
 Pokurumali Fernando as Nilantha's wife
 Marcus Fernando
 Pahandi Nethara as Nilantha's daughter
 Sahansa Dihansi

Production
The film marked the first feature film direction by Shirley Samarasinghe, who has awarded as a director of short films and documentaries. Samarasinghe has gained professional experience by participating in various films as an assistant director and production manager while studying the diploma course of the National Film Corporation. There are two main roles which are played by Kalana Gunasekara and Chamatka Lakmini. Two more small children were used to highlight a cinematic experience that can be watched by the whole family that gives a fresh interpretation of love.

The production crew started filming in Tangalle to capture the beauty of Sri Lanka. After that, it was filmed in Ampara, Anuradhapura, Jaffna, Kurunegala, Nuwara Eliya, Colombo and Kandy. The film contains three songs where the main theme was an aesthetic journey through which their lives flow. But in the bottom line, the happiness, pain, breakdowns and new hopes in life are all contained.

Screening
The media screening of the film was held at the Colombo City Center Cinema in April 2022. The trailer was released online in May 2022.

References

External links
 "Fly Once More" official trailer on YouTube

2022 films
2020s Sinhala-language films
2022 romantic drama films
Sri Lankan romantic drama films
2020s road movies